The Scotland men's national field hockey team represents Scotland in men's international field hockey competitions, with the exception of the Olympic Games when Scottish players are eligible to play for the Great Britain men's national field hockey team. Prior to the formation of the Great Britain team in 1920, Scotland competed at the 1908 Summer Olympics in London, sharing the bronze medal with Wales.

Tournament history

Summer Olympics
 1908 –

EuroHockey Championship

EuroHockey Championship II
 2007 – 
 2009 – 5th place
 2011 – 
 2013 – 6th place
 2015 – 
 2017 – 
 2021 –

Commonwealth Games
 2006 – 7th place
 2010 – 9th place
 2014 – 8th place
 2018 – 6th place
 2022 – 9th place

Hockey World League
 2012–13 – 24th place
 2016–17 – 19th place

FIH Hockey Series
2018–19 – Second round

Champions Challenge II
 2011 – 4th place

Players

Current squad
The following 18 players were named on 5 July 2022 for the 2022 Commonwealth Games in Birmingham, England from 29 July to 8 August 2022.

Caps updated as of 6 August 2022, after the match against Ghana.

Head coach: Derek Forsyth

Recent call-ups
The following players have been called up for the national team in the last 12 months.

See also
Great Britain men's national field hockey team
Scotland women's national field hockey team

References

External links
Official website
FIH profile

National team
European men's national field hockey teams
Men's national sports teams of Scotland